Chhedagad is an urban municipality located in the Jajarkot District of Karnali Province of Nepal.

The municipality is divided into 13 wards in total.

On the 10 March 2017, the Government of Nepal announced 744 local level units as per the new constitution of Nepal 2015, Chedagad municipality came into existence merging following former VDCs: Salma, Dasera, Suwanauli, Pajaru, Jhapra and Karkigaun. The headquarters of the municipality are located at Karkigaun

Demographics
At the time of the 2011 Nepal census, Chhedagad Municipality had a population of 35,295. Of these, 100.0% spoke Nepali as their first language.

In terms of ethnicity/caste, 45.8% were Chhetri, 21.5% Kami, 6.9% Hill Brahmin, 6.4% Thakuri, 5.9% Magar, 4.3% Damai/Dholi, 3.8% Sanyasi/Dasnami, 3.4% Sarki, 1.3% Badi, 0.3% Lohar, 0.1% Gaine and 0.1% others.

In terms of religion, 99.6% were Hindu and 0.4% Christian.

References

External links
www.chhedagadmun.gov.np

Populated places in Jajarkot District
Municipalities in Karnali Province
Nepal municipalities established in 2017